Galzignano Terme is a comune (municipality) in the Province of Padua in the Italian region Veneto, located about  southwest of Venice and about  southwest of Padua.

Etymology 
The illustrious academic Olivieri thought that the name of Galzignano came from the Latin word Gallicinus, with the suffix -anu. This means that the lord of this territory left his mark on this area: his name inspired the name of the future town of Galzignano Terme.

History 
The oldest document in which we find the name of the town of Galzignano goes back to February, 9th 952 A.D
with the Holy Roman Emperor Otto I who said 

In other documents found in Verona, February 14 1077 A.D, we find the quote 

As we can see, the origin of this town is very ancient. Due to the recovery of a boundary stone in 1922, we can say that this town had been occupied by the Romans during the Roman period.
An ancient Franciscan monastery, built in 1226 A.D. is also located in Galzignano.

In the 12th-13th century of the Guelphs and Ghibellines, Galzignano was an important and almost autonomous area, controlled by the podesta of Padova This territory was later occupied by Venice, by Austria and France. It then became part of the Kingdom of Italy in 1866 A.D.

Main sights 
 Benedictine monastery of Santa Maria Annunziata, now in ruins.
 Camaldolese hermitage of Monte Rua
 Benedictine monastery of St. John the Baptist on Monte Venda (13th century), also in ruins
 Santa Maria Assunta - Church rebuilt in 1674.
 San Lorenzo di Valsanzibio - parish church
 Oratory of the Holy Trinity (14th century), housing some precious frescoes.
 Villa Rizzoli Benedetti (1st century, remade in the 18th century)
 Villa La Civrana (17th century)
 Villa Barbarigo Pizzoni Ardemani: main attraction in territory, located in the frazione Valsanzibio, with a notable 17th-century garden.

Local products

Olive oil 
Olive oil is obtained from the olive and it is a traditional product of the Mediterranean Basin.
The oil is produced by pressing whole olives. It is used throughout the world and is especially associated with Mediterranean countries and Mediterranean climate.

Olive trees were introduced in the Euganean Hills a long time ago.

With the domination of Venice from 1400 on, olives gained a new importance and even after that, olive farming was never abandoned again: olive trees are inextricably linked with the Euganean Hills. For this reason Galzignano Terme and other municipalities around this area have a very important role in the production of olive oil.

DOC and DOCG Wine 
The territory of the Euganean Hills is very important for the production of wine in the Veneto region.
There is a rich soil that gives the best conditions to cultivate the grapevines. Due to this fact, the towns in this area join forces to support and promote to the public the typical products of their lands.

For this reason the association “La Strada del Vino” (“The Wine Street”), conceived in 2002, gathers up all the restaurants, the wine cellars, the farms and other companies in the area of Euganean Hills to create a list of all the local products and services in the territory.

The aim of the association is to promote and to popularize the quality of tasting experiences in the area, thanks to the quality of wines and traditional food.
Galzignano Terme is part of “The Wine Street” and within its lands we find the production of two very important wines: Moscato (muscat) and Fior d'Arancio.
 Moscato dei Colli Euganei (muscat from Euganean Hills) is a DOC wine. DOC brand means that the wine has a registered designation of origin and it guarantees the good quality of the product. Muscat is produced by white muscat grapes and it can be accompanied by many kinds of dishes like asparagus and fish. We can find muscat in its dry version or like champagne.
 Fior d'Arancio dei Colli Euganei (Fior F'Arancio from Euganean Hills) is a DOCG wine. DOCG brand means that the wine has a registered designation of origin and that it is guaranteed. This wine is the best wine in Galzignano Terme and it has three different varieties:
 Fior d'Arancio Passito: is very sweet, with the taste of honey, fruits (especially apricots) and spices. It can be accompanied by Zaleti, a particular type of cookie made with flour and raisins.
 Fior d'Arancio secco: is a very dry and fragrant wine. It can be accompanied by white meat and shellfish.
 Fior d'arancio Spumante: is a sweet and sparkling wine. It is Very common at parties and not particularly alcoholic. It can be accompanied by cakes and other weet dishes.

Sports

Football

Polisportiva Real Terme

Atletico Galzignano

References

Cities and towns in Veneto
Spa towns in Italy